Casimiro Vega (born 1907, date of death unknown) was an Argentine weightlifter. He competed in the men's featherweight event at the 1928 Summer Olympics.

References

1907 births
Year of death missing
Argentine male weightlifters
Olympic weightlifters of Argentina
Weightlifters at the 1928 Summer Olympics
Place of birth missing